Sajadiyeh or Sajjadiyeh may refer to:
 Sajadiyeh, Bushehr
 Sajadiyeh, Kerman
 Sajjadiyeh, Khuzestan
 Sajadiyeh, Mazandaran